The Permaculture Institute of El Salvador (IPES) is a grassroots organization of subsistence farmers, which registered as a Not for Profit Foundation with the government of El Salvador in 2002. The mission is to promote permaculture for the development of a healthier, wiser and more ecologically sustainable society. IPES started small. Relying on volunteers and small donations, it taught ecological farming to small groups of farmers in a handful of communities. Over the past years, they have expanded enormously to meet the rapidly growing demand from poor rural communities for ways of sustainable living and farming.

IPES now teaches subsistence farming families to improve their environment and adapt to climate change, supporting their self sufficiency and food security by implementing sustainable agriculture practices. IPES strengthens community organisation and supports ecological community development, training community leaders in permaculture and promoting the active participation of women and young people in the ecological development of their communities. IPES also supports the formation of local permaculture networks of communities and organisations as well as supporting the development of local and national strategies for ecologically sustainable development.

IPES is also linked with the Permaculture Association (Britain) and Permaculture Association Latin America.

References

External links
 

Permaculture organizations
Organizations based in El Salvador
Agriculture in El Salvador